The Dutch East India Company missions to Edo were regular tribute missions to the court of the Tokugawa shōgun in Edo (modern Tokyo) to reassure the ties between the Bakufu and the Opperhoofd. The Opperhoofd of the Dutch factory in Dejima and his attendants were escorted by the Japanese to Edo where they presented exotic and elaborate gifts to the shōgun: clocks, telescopes, medicines, artillery and rare animals were usual gifts of the tribute missions. The shōgun would correspond at the same time with gifts to the Dutch. The tribute system, as in China, served to enhance the idea of the shōguns supremacy to his subjects.

See also 
 Japan–Netherlands relations
 VOC Opperhoofden in Japan
 List of Westerners who visited Japan before 1868

References 

Dutch East India Company
Edo period
Japan–Netherlands relations